Carl Bradshaw OD is a Jamaican actor and film producer who has been described as "Jamaica's most renowned actor" and "arguably Jamaica's premier actor".

Career
Carl Bradshaw grew up in the Kingston ghetto of Standpipe, and was educated at Excelsior High School. He was a keen actor and athlete as a teenager and his talent won him a scholarship at the University of Pennsylvania. He received a master's degree in Physical Science.

Bradshaw represented Jamaica in the 400m in 1968. He also competed in the 400m hurdles. He went on to take up the role of Head of Physical Education at Excelsior High School, where he was working when he was cast as Jose, one of the lead roles in Perry Henzell's 1973 film The Harder They Come, after initially getting involved as an extra. Bradshaw described how the role originated: "When I met Perry, there was no script. He asked me to make up a story for my character, so I gave him a line about some guy who'd owed me money for ages."

Carl Bradshaw appears in Grand Theft Auto IV as the host of Tuff Gong Radio radio station.

He took the lead role of Ringo in the 1976 film Smile Orange, and also had roles on Countryman and Dancehall Queen, which he also co-produced while Director of Operations for Island Entertainment Jamaica. He went on to act in most of the major Jamaican films, including Third World Cop, One Love, Henzell's second film No Place Like Home, and the 2009 film Wah Do Dem. He played a Jamaican mystic in the 2011 supernatural thriller The Skin.

Bradshaw has won several awards for his acting, including the Doctor Bird Award and the Carifesta Film Festival Award of Excellence, and has been described as "Jamaica's most renowned actor" and "arguably Jamaica's premier actor". In October 2017 he was awarded the Order of Distinction by the Jamaican government.

Films

As actor
The Harder They Come (1972) – Jose
Smile Orange (1976) – Ringo
Countryman (1982) – Captain Benchley
Club Paradise (1986) – Cab Driver
The Mighty Quinn (1989) – Cocodick
Goldeneye (1989) – Magistrate
The Lunatic (1991) – Service
Kla$h (1995) – Walker
Dancehall Queen (1997) – Police Officer #1 (also producer)
Third World Cop (1999) – One Hand (also associate producer)
Ritual (2002) – Ramon
One Love (2003) – Obeah Man
Runt (2005) – The Real Henry Davis (also associate producer)
 (2005) – Shervin
No Place Like Home (2006) – Carl
Wah Do Dem (2009) – Mystic Man
Better Mus' Come (2010) – Rasta Elder 1
King of the Dancehall (2016) – The Farmer

Television
Runaway Bay (1992–1993) – Inspector Grant

References

External links
 

Jamaican film producers
Living people
People from Kingston, Jamaica
20th-century Jamaican male actors
21st-century Jamaican male actors
Jamaican male film actors
Jamaican male television actors
Year of birth missing (living people)
Jamaican male actors